Andrea Sedláčková (born 22 February 1967) is a Czech film director, editor and screenwriter. Her 2000 film Victims and Murderers was entered into the 23rd Moscow International Film Festival.

Selected filmography

Director
 Victims and Murderers (2000)
 Seducer (2002)
 Fair Play (2014)
 Backstage (2018)

Editor
 Our Happy Lives (1999)
 Sachs' Disease (1999)
 Une hirondelle a fait le printemps (2001)
 Love Me If You Dare (2004)
 Malabar Princess (2004)
 Joyeux Noël (2005)
 Contre-enquête (2007)
 Welcome (2009)
 Farewell (2009)
 With Love... from the Age of Reason (2010)
 Demi-soeur (2013)
 L'Odeur de la mandarine (2015)
 A Kid (2016)
 Garde alternée (2017)

References

External links

1967 births
Living people
Czech film editors
Czech screenwriters
Czech women film directors
Film directors from Prague
Women film editors
Czech women screenwriters